The Glorious Revolution of 1688 rearranged the political map of Europe, and led to a series of wars with France that lasted well over a century.  This was the classic age of sail; while the ships themselves evolved in only minor ways, technique and tactics were honed to a high degree, and the battles of the Napoleonic Wars entailed feats that would have been impossible for the fleets of the 17th century. Because of parliamentary opposition, James II fled the country. The landing of William III and the Glorious Revolution itself was a gigantic effort involving 100 warships and 400 transports carrying 11,000 infantry and 4,000 horses. It was not opposed by the English or Scottish fleets.

Historical overview

Naval operations in the War of the Spanish Succession (1702–13) were with the Dutch against the Spanish and French. They were at first focused on the acquisition of a Mediterranean base, culminating in an alliance with Portugal and the capture of Gibraltar (1704) and Port Mahon in Menorca (1708). In addition Newfoundland and Nova Scotia were obtained. Even so, freedom of action in the Mediterranean did not decide the war, although it gave the new Kingdom of Great Britain (created by the Union of England and Scotland in 1707) an advantage when negotiating the Peace of Utrecht, and made Britain a recognized great power. The British fleet ended Spanish occupation of Sicily in 1718 and in 1727 blockaded Panama.

The subsequent quarter-century of peace saw a few naval actions. The navy was used against Russia and Sweden in the Baltic from 1715 to 1727 to protect supplies of naval stores. It was used at the Cape Passaro in 1718, during the Great Northern War, and in the West Indies (1726). There was a war against Spain in 1739 over the slave trade. In 1745 the navy transported troops and stores to Scotland to defeat the Jacobite rising.

The War of Jenkins' Ear (1739–48) saw various naval operations in the Caribbean under different admirals against Spanish trade and possessions, before the war subsequently merged into the wider War of the Austrian Succession (1740–1748). This, in turn, brought a new round of naval operations against France. In 1745 the navy twice defeated the French off Finisterre but their convoys escaped. The Navy also defended against invasion by Charles Edward Stuart the "Young Pretender". By the end of the war, the Navy was fully engaged in the worldwide protection of British trade.

The Seven Years' War (1756–63) began somewhat inauspiciously for the Navy, with a French siege of Menorca and the failure to relieve it. Menorca was lost but subsequent operations went more successfully (due more to government support and better strategic thinking, rather than admirals "encouraged" by Byng's example), and the British fleet won several victories.  The French tried to invade Britain in 1759 but their force was defeated at Quiberon Bay. Spain entered the war against Britain in 1762 but lost Havana and Manila, though the latter was given back in exchange for Florida. The Treaty of Paris that ended the war left Britain with colonial gains, but isolated strategically.

At the beginning of the American Revolutionary War (1775–83), the Royal Navy dealt with the fledgling Continental Navy handily, destroying or capturing many of its vessels. France soon took the American side, and in 1778 a French fleet sailed for America, where it attempted to land at Rhode Island and nearly engaged with the British fleet before a storm intervened Spain and the Dutch Republic entered the war in 1780. Action shifted to the Caribbean, where there were a number of battles with varying results. The most important operation came in 1781 when, in the Battle of the Chesapeake, the British failed to lift the French blockade of Lord Cornwallis, resulting in a British surrender in the Battle of Yorktown. Although combat was over in North America, it continued in the Caribbean and India, where the British experienced both successes and failures. Though Menorca had been recaptured, it was returned to the Spanish.

Organization eighteenth century

Admiralty of Great Britain

Commander in chiefs
Queen Anne
King George I
King George II
King George III

Naval Lords of England and Great Britain
Office of the Lord High Admiral of England
Office of the Vice-Admiral of England
Office of the Rear-Admiral of England
Office of the Lord High Admiral of Great Britain
Office of the Vice-Admiral of Great Britain
Office of the Rear-Admiral of Great Britain

Civil administration of the Navy

Board of Admiralty
The Board of Admiralty and the Lord's Commissioners executing the office of the Lord High Admiral

the Board of Admiralty 
Private Office of the First Lord of the Admiralty, and member of the English government to 1706, member of the British government (1707–1801).
Office of Private Secretary to the First Lord of the Admiralty
Office of the Clerk of the Admiralty
Office of the Admiralty Clerk of the Journals appointed,(1638 – 1741). 
Messenger of the Admiralty, appointed, 1687.
Housekeeper of the Admiralty appointed, (1687 – 1799)
Doorkeeper of the Admiralty, 1687.
Gardner of the Admiralty appointed (1687 – 1799)
Office of the Translator to the Admiralty, (1755 – 1869)

Civil Commissioner
First Secretary to the Admiralty (1652 – present)
Office of the Chief Clerk of the Admiralty, appointed, (1694 – 1870). 
Deputy Secretary to the Admiralty (1728 – 41), (1744 – 6), (1756 – 9), (1764 – 83). 
Joint Secretary to the Admiralty (1741 – 1742). 
Office of the Second Secretary to the Admiralty (1702 – 1766), (1759 – 1763), 

Naval Lords
Naval Lord Commissioners (1700 – 1762)
Senior Naval Lord from (1689 – 1860)

Lords Commissioners of the Admiralty 609 commissioners served during 18th century

Notes: Between 1693 and 1830 the commission always included either 1 or 2 additional naval lords except from 1757 until 1782 when it was just the Senior Naval Lord. After 1830 the Naval Lords are titled, First, Second, Third, Fourth until 1904 when they are re-styled Sea Lord. A junior naval lord is introduced in 1868 until 1903 then is re-styled Fifth Sea lord from 1917.

Judicial administration
Office of the Lord High Admiral
Advocate General to the office of the Lord High Admiral

Legal Advisors to the admiralty courts
Office of the Lord High Admiral
Office of the Counsel to the Admiralty, ( attached originally to the Navy Board) appointed 1673–1824
Office of Solicitor for the affairs of the Admiralty and Navy, appointed, (1692 – 1799).

High court of the admiralty
Office of the High Court of the Admiralty Court (1450 – 1875).
Office of the President and Judge of the High Court in England and Wales only.
Office of the Judge Advocate of the Fleet
Office of the Deputy Judge Advocate of the Fleet
Office of the Proctor of the High Court
Office of the Marshall of the High Court
Office of the Droits of the High Court
Vice Admiralty Courts (Home)
Vice Admiralty Jurisdictions and prizes (Abroad)
Note:Admiralty Courts date to at least the 1360s, during the reign of Edward III. At that time there were three such Courts, appointed by Admirals responsible for waters to the north, south and west of England. In 1483 these local courts were amalgamated into a single High Court of Admiralty, administered by the Lord High Admiral of England.

Vice admiralty courts
Vice-Admiral of the Coast  was responsible for the defence of one of the twenty maritime counties of England, the North and South of Wales, Scotland and Ireland As a Vice-Admiral, the post holder was the chief of naval administration for his district. His responsibilities included, deciding the outcome of the Prize court (captured by pirate ships), dealing with salvage claims for wrecks, acting as a judge in relation to maritime issues.

England
 Vice-Admiral Cheshire
 Vice-Admiral Cornwall
 Vice-Admiral Cumberland
 Vice-Admiral Devon
 Vice-Admiral Dorset
 Vice-Admiral Durham
 Vice-Admiral Essex
 Vice-Admiral Gloucestershire
 Vice-Admiral Hampshire
 Vice-Admiral Kent
 Vice-Admiral Lancashire
 Vice-Admiral Lincolnshire
 Vice-Admiral Norfolk
 Vice-Admiral Northumberland
 Vice-Admiral Somerset
 Vice-Admiral Suffolk
 Vice-Admiral Sussex
 Vice-Admiral Westmorland
 Vice-Admiral Yorkshire

Ireland
 Vice-Admiral Ireland
 Vice-Admiral Connaught
 Vice-Admiral Leinster
 Vice-Admiral Munster
 Vice-Admiral Ulster
Scotland
 Vice-Admiral Scotland
 Vice-Admiral Orkney and Shetland
 Vice-Admiral Western Coast
Wales
 Vice-Admiral North Wales
 Vice-Admiral South Wales

Vice Admiralty Jurisdictions and prizes abroad
By appointing Vice-Admirals in the colonies, and by constituting courts as Vice-Admiralty Courts, the terminology recognized that the existence and superiority of the "mother" court in the United Kingdom.  Thus, the "vice" tag denoted that whilst it was a separate court, it was not equal to the "mother" court.  In the case of the courts abroad, a right of appeal lay back to the British Admiralty Court, which further reinforced this superiority.  In all respects, the court was an Imperial court rather than a local Colonial court.

North America
Vice-Admiral Carolina (1694–1712)
Vice-Admiral Georgia (1754–1777)
Vice-Admiral Maryland (1697–1776)
Vice-Admiral Massachusetts (1698–1776)
Vice-Admiral New Hampshire (1699–1776)
Vice-Admiral New York, including, Connecticut and New Jersey (1694–1776)
Vice-Admiral North Carolina (1729–1776)
Vice-Admiral Pennsylvania, including Delaware, (1697–1776)
Vice-Admiral Rhode Island (1704–1776)
Vice-Admiral South Carolina (1712–1776)
Vice-Admiral Virginia (1697–1776)
 
West Indies
Vice-Admiral Barbados
Vice-Admiral Jamaica

Naval operations

Senior leadership
Naval High Command included: 
Office of the Lord High Admiral (1600–1628)
Office of the Vice-Admiral of England (1600–1707)
Office of the Vice-Admiral of Great Britain (1707–1801)
Office of the Rear-Admiral of England (1600–1707)
Office of the Rear-Admiral of Great Britain (1707–1801)
Office of the First lord of the Admiralty (1628–1964)
Office of the Naval Lord of the Admiralty.
Admiralty Secretariat
Board of longitude 
Greenwich Hospital
Nautical Almanac Office
Office of the Chaplain General
Office of the Charity for Sea Officers’ Widows
Office of the Compassionate Fund
Office of the Hydrographer of the Navy
Office of the Poor Knights of Windsor
Register office 
Royal Naval Academy
Royal Observatory
Sixpenny Office

Fleet commands
Flag officers of the fleet

Admiral of the Fleet Red 
Vice-Admiral of the Red. 
Rear-Admiral of the Red. 
Admiral of the White.  
Vice-Admiral of the White.  
Rear-Admiral of the White
Admiral of the Blue.  
Vice-Admiral of the Blue. 
Rear-Admiral of the Blue

Flag officers commanding fleets and stations

Fleets
Commander-in-Chief, Channel Fleet (1690 – 1909).
Commander-in-Chief, Mediterranean Fleet (1690 – 1967).
Home Commands
Commander-in-Chief, Coast of Ireland Station (1797 – 1922).
Commander-in-Chief, The Downs (1777 – 1815) 
Commander-in-Chief, The Nore (1742 – 1961)
Admiral-Superintendent, Chatham (1752 – 1955)
Captain Superintendent, Sheerness (1799 – 1898).
Commander-in-Chief, North Sea (1782 – 1815) 
Commander-in-Chief, Portsmouth (1697 – 1969).
Admiral-superintendent, Portsmouth (1707 – 1712), (1832 – 1969)
Commander-in-Chief, Plymouth (1743 – 1969).
Admiral-Superintendent, Plymouth (1707 – 1712), (1832 – 1966)
Overseas Commands

Commander-in-Chief, Jamaica Station (1655 – 1830).
Commander-in-Chief, Newfoundland Station (1729 – 1825).
Commander-in-Chief, East Indies Station (1744 – 1941).
Commander-in-Chief, North America Station (1745 – 1818).
Commander-in-Chief, Leeward Islands Station (1775 – 1853).
Commander-in-Chief, Cape of Good Hope Station (1795 – 1939).

Fleet units

Squadrons 
 Red Squadron
 White Squadron
 Blue Squadron

Administrative and logistical support

Board of Ordnance
Office of the Board of Ordnance. (1597–1855)  
Office of the Master-General of the Ordnance (1597–1855)
Office of the Lieutenant-General of the Ordnance (1597–1855) 
Office of the Treasurer of the Ordinance (1597–1855)
Office of the Surveyor-General of the Ordnance (1597–1888)
Office of the Clerk of the Ordnance (1554–1853)
Office of the Storekeeper of the Ordnance (1558–1845)
Office of the Clerk of Deliveries of the Ordnance (1570–1812)
Officers and Officials of Ordnance yards and stores

Ordnance yards and stores
Home Ordnance Yards
The Gun Wharf, Chatham Dockyard, 
Gunwharf Portsmouth Dockyard,

Gunpowder Magazines Stores
Tower of London, London, (1461–1855)
Square Tower, Portsmouth, (1584–1855)

Navy board
Construction, design, maintenance, material, supplies
Office of the Navy Board also known as the Navy Office
Office of the Comptroller of the Navy (1597–1832)
Office of the Surveyor of the Navy (1597–1832)
Office of the Inspector of Naval Repairs (1731–1796).
Naval Works Department (1796 – 1813)  
Office of the Inspector General of Naval Works (1796 – 1808)
Office of the Architect of Naval Works (1796 – 1808)
Office of the Mechanist of Naval Works (1796 – 1808)
Office of the Mechanist of Naval Works (1796 – 1808)
Office of the Chemist of Naval Works (1796 – 1808)
Office of the Secretary of Naval Works (1731–1799).
Offices the Master Shipwrights of Naval Dockyards
Office of the Treasurer of the Navy (1546–1597).
Navy Pay Office
Office of the Paymaster of the Navy
Allotment Office
Bills and Accounts Office
Navy Branch
Office for Examining Treasurer's Accounts 
Prize Branch
Remittance Office
Ticket Office
Office for Seaman's Wages
Office for Stores
Office of the Clerk of the Acts (1413–1796)
Office of the Controller of Treasurer Accounts (1667–1796)
Office of the Controller of Victualling Accounts (1667–1796)
Contract Office
Office of the Controller of Storekeepers Accounts (1671–1796)
Storekeepers HM Yards

Subsidiary boards
Office of the Navy Board
Office of the Comptroller of the Navy (1597–1831)
Sick and Hurt Board, (established temporarily in times of war from 1653, placed on a permanent footing from 1715).
Royal Naval Hospitals.
Transport Board (1690–1724, re-established 1794–1862).
Penal Transportation
Victualling Board (1683–1832).
Office of the Chairman of the Board
Office of the Commissioners of the Board
Office of the Secretary for Cash and Stores Accounts.
Cash Department
Stores Department
Victualling Yard, Antigua
Office of the Commissioner Antigua
Victualling Yard Deptford.
Office of the Commissioner Deptford
Victualling Yard, Gibraltar
Office of the Commissioner Gibraltar
Victualling Yard, Harwich
Office of the Commissioner Harwich
Victualling Yard, Jamaica
Office of the Commissioner Jamaica
Victualling Yard, Portsmouth
Office of the Commissioner Portsmouth
Victualling Yard, Plymouth
Office of the Commissioner Plymouth

Shore facilities
Note: Dockyards during this period were managed by the individual Commissioners of the Navy for each yard.

Home naval base and dockyards
Portsmouth Dockyard (1496–present), still active.
Woolwich Dockyard (1512–1869).
Deptford Dockyard (1513–1869).
Erith Dockyard. (1514–1521), failed Yard: due to persistent flooding.
Chatham Dockyard (1567–1983).
Sheerness Dockyard (1665–1957).
Plymouth Dockyard, Plymouth (1690–1824)

Oversea naval bases and dockyards

Jamaica Dockyard – Port Royal (1675–1905).
Gibraltar Dockyard (1704–1982).
Port Mahon Dockyard, Menorca,  (1708–1802) 
Nelson's Dockyard, Antigua (1723–1889).
Royal Naval Dockyard, Halifax,  Canada, (1759–1905).
Navy Island Dockyard, Navy Island, Ontario, Canada, (1763–1822).
Kingston Dockyard, Canada, (1783–1853).
York Shipyards, Upper Canada (1793–1813)
Royal Naval Dockyard, Bermuda (1795–1951).
Amherstburg Royal Naval Dockyard, Canada (1796–1813).

Marines

Marine department
 Office of the Admirals Regiment, (1655 – 1755). 
 Office of the Marine Department, (1755 – 1809). 
Marine Pay Office
(Office of the Paymaster of the Marines, (1784 – 1831).

Marine forces
Office of Corps of the Royal Marines (1755)
Colonel Commandant Chatham Division
Colonel Commandant Portsmouth Division
Colonel Commandant Plymouth Division

Impress service
Note: Responsible for forced naval recruitment, the admiralty handled command and control of the impress service, whilst the navy board administered the service.
Office of the Impress Service
Office of the Admiral Commanding Impress Service.
Offices of the Captains Regulating the Impress Service Ports.

Sea fencible militias
Notes:The Sea Fencibles were a British naval militia, mostly volunteers, that was formed in 1793 to act as an anti-invasion force in coastal waters.

Office of the Director Sea Fencibles.
Offices of the Fencible Districts

Sea Fencible Districts, 1798 to 1801 

 Emsworth to Beachy Head
 Beachy Head to Deal
 Deal to Faversham
 Leigh to Harwich
 Harwich to Yarmouth
 Isle of Wight
 Coast of Hampshire
 Coast of Dorset
 Coast of Devon
 Plymouth to Land's End
 Saltfleet to Flamborough Head

References

Sources
The Statutes of the United Kingdom of Great Britain and Ireland, 3 George IV. 1822.  London: By His Majesty's Statute and Law Printer.  1822.
Hamilton, Admiral Sir. R. Vesey, G.C.B. (1896).  Naval Administration: The Constitution, Character, and Functions of the Board of Admiralty, and of the Civil Departments it Directs.  London: George Bell and Sons.
Logan, Karen Dale (1976).  The Admiralty: Reforms and Re-organization, 1868–1892.  Unpublished Ph.D. dissertation.  University of Oxford.
Miller, Francis H. (1884).  The Origin and Constitution of the Admiralty and Navy Boards, to which is added an Account of the various Buildings in which the Business of the Navy has been transacted from time to time.  London: For Her Majesty's Stationery Office.  Copy in Greene Papers.  National Maritime Museum.  GEE/19.
 Rodger. N.A.M., (1979) The Admiralty (offices of state), T. Dalton, Lavenham, .

External links
 
 
 

History of the Royal Navy